Pauwels van Hillegaert (1596–1640) was a Dutch Golden Age painter of landscapes and military scenes.

Biography

Pauwels was christened on 29 July 1596 in Amsterdam. His parents were Francois van Hillegaert and Janneke Spierinx.  He married Anneken Homis from Antwerp in 1620 (marriage license on 27 June 1620), with whom he had several children, including the painter with the same name, Pauwels van Hillegaert II (1621–1658). This Pauwels Jr. married Cornelia de Vlieger (daughter of Simon de Vlieger) and had two daughters. When Pauwels Jr. like his father died at a relatively young age, Cornelis de Bie wrote a commemorative poem about him.

Pauwels Sr. won royal commissions to paint battle scenes, most notably for the Siege of 's-Hertogenbosch in 1629. He also won a commission for the Battle of Nieuwpoort. He also painted Italianate landscapes, but was mostly admired for his paintings with horses and armor.

References

External links
Pauwels van Hillegaert at PubHist

1596 births
1640 deaths
Dutch Golden Age painters
Dutch male painters
Painters from Amsterdam